Jordan Ngatai (born 7 March 1993) is a New Zealand professional basketball player for the Hawke's Bay Hawks of the New Zealand National Basketball League (NZNBL). He played six seasons with the New Zealand Breakers in the Australian NBL and is a regular New Zealand Tall Black. In the New Zealand NBL, he is a four-time champion.

Early life and career
Born and raised in Porirua, New Zealand, Ngatai graduated from Mana College before attending Sierra College in the United States for one year. For the 2013–14 season, he played basketball for BYU–Hawaii.

Professional career
Ngatai made his debut in the New Zealand NBL in 2012 with the Wellington Saints. In his second season with Wellington in 2014, he won his first championship. He subsequently joined the New Zealand Breakers as a development player for the 2014–15 NBL season and was a member of the Breakers' championship-winning team. After a season with the Manawatu Jets in 2015, Ngatai re-joined the Breakers as a development player for the 2015–16 NBL season.

After a season with the Taranaki Mountainairs in 2016, Ngatai was promoted to the full-time playing roster of the Breakers for the 2016–17 NBL season.

In 2017 and 2019, Ngatai won championships with the Wellington Saints. He was acquired by the Otago Nuggets for the 2020 season, going on to win his fourth NZNBL championship.

On 14 August 2020, Ngatai signed a two-year deal with the Cairns Taipans.

Ngatai returned to the Wellington Saints in 2022 and then joined the Hawke's Bay Hawks in 2023.

National team career
Ngatai made his senior international debut for the Tall Blacks in 2013 at the FIBA Oceania Championships. He represented New Zealand at the 2017 FIBA Asia Cup in Lebanon, where the team ended up in fourth position. He was a key member of the national side which claimed the bronze medal at the 2018 Commonwealth Games. He was included in the New Zealand squad for the 2019 FIBA Basketball World Cup.

References

External links
Jordan Ngatai at nbl.com.au
Jordan Ngatai at archive.fiba.com

1993 births
Living people
2019 FIBA Basketball World Cup players
Basketball players at the 2018 Commonwealth Games
BYU–Hawaii Seasiders men's basketball players
Cairns Taipans players
Commonwealth Games bronze medallists for New Zealand
Commonwealth Games medallists in basketball
Junior college men's basketball players in the United States
Manawatu Jets players
New Zealand Breakers players
New Zealand expatriate basketball people in the United States
New Zealand men's basketball players
Otago Nuggets players
Sportspeople from Porirua
Sierra College alumni
Small forwards
Taranaki Mountainairs players
Wellington Saints players
Medallists at the 2018 Commonwealth Games